The XIV Racquetball European Championship was held in Brembate (Italy) from July 28 to August 4, 2007, with six men's national teams and four women's national teams in competition. On August 1 started the individual competition.

The venue was the Centro Sportivo Comunale di Brembate, in Brembate (Bergamo), with 2 regulation racquetball courts. The 6 men's teams were Belgium, Catalonia, Germany, Ireland, Italy and The Netherlands and the 3 women's teams were Catalonia, Germany and Ireland. More than 50 players were in the singles, doubles, junior and senior competitions.

The opening ceremony was on July 28 with the Vice President of European Racquetball Federation, Mike Mesecke, and the President of Racquetball Italia, Marco Arnoldi, in attendance.

Men's national teams competition

First round

Final round

Semifinals

5th and 6th places

3rd and 4th places

FINAL

Men's teams final standings

Women's national teams competition

Women's teams final standings

Individual men's competition

Individual women's competition

See also
European Racquetball Championships

External links
Results for the men's teams competition ERF website
Results for the women's teams competition ERF website
European Racquetball Federation

European Racquetball Championships
Racquetball
Racquetball in Italy
2007 in Italian sport
International sports competitions hosted by Italy